Adelbert Schulz (20 December 1903 – 28 January 1944) was a German officer of the police and the Wehrmacht, at last general and division commander in the Panzertruppe during World War II. He was one of only 27 recipients of the Knight's Cross of the Iron Cross with Oak Leaves, Swords and Diamonds of Nazi Germany.

Life
Adelbert (sometimes written Adalbert) Schulz was born on 20 December 1903 in Berlin; he began his career in the police. In 1935 Schulz transferred from the Police to the German Army. Schulz's unit took part in the occupations of Austria and the Sudetenland. He participated in the Battle of France serving under General Erwin Rommel. On the 29 September 1940 he received the Knight's Cross of the Iron Cross. He was awarded the Oak Leaves to his Knights Cross on 31 December 1941. On 6 August 1943 he received the Swords to his Knight's Cross and was promoted to Colonel. On 9 January 1944, he received Diamonds to his knights Cross, was promoted to Generalmajor and made commander of the 7th Panzer Division.

Death
Schulz was wounded in action in the area of Shepetivka on 28 January 1944, and died the same day.

Awards
 Iron Cross (1939) 2nd Class (24 May 1940) & 1st Class (24 May 1940)
 Knight's Cross of the Iron Cross with Oak Leaves, Swords and Diamonds
 Knight's Cross on 29 September 1940 as Hauptmann and chief of the 1./Panzer-Regiment 25
 47th Oak Leaves on 31 December 1941 as Hauptmann and commander of the I./Panzer-Regiment 25
 33rd Swords on 6 August 1943 as Oberstleutnant and commander of the Panzer-Regiment 25
 9th Diamonds on 14 December 1943 as Oberst and commander of the Panzer-Regiment 25'

References

Citations

Bibliography

 
 Kurowski, Franz (2008). Generalmajor Adelbert Schulz Mit der 7. Panzerdivision in West und Ost (in German). Flechsig Verlag. .
 
 

1903 births
1944 deaths
Military personnel from Berlin
Major generals of the German Army (Wehrmacht)
German police officers
German Army personnel killed in World War II
Recipients of the Knight's Cross of the Iron Cross with Oak Leaves, Swords and Diamonds
German Army generals of World War II